Sled Tavare Dowabobo (born 31 March 1983) is a Nauruan judoka. He participated at the 2012 Summer Olympics in the Men's 73 kg event, but was eliminated in the first round by Navruz Jurakobilov of Uzbekistan.

References

External links
 

Living people
1983 births
Nauruan male judoka
Judoka at the 2012 Summer Olympics
Olympic judoka of Nauru